Peltigera horizontalis is a species of lichen in the family Peltigeraceae. It was first described by British botanist William Hudson in 1762 as Lichen horizontalis. German botanist Johann Christian Gottlob Baumgarten transferred it to the genus Peltigera in 1790.

References

horizontalis
Lichen species
Lichens described in 1790
Lichens of Europe
Lichens of Canada
Lichens of North America
Taxa named by William Hudson (botanist)
Fungi without expected TNC conservation status